Pierre François Olive Rayer (8 March 1793 – 10 September 1867) was a French physician who was a native of Saint Sylvain. He made important contributions in the fields of pathological anatomy, physiology, comparative pathology and parasitology.

Biography 
He studied medicine at Caen, and afterwards in Paris at the Ecole Pratique des Hautes Etudes and at the Hôtel-Dieu. He became an interne of medicine in 1813, and in 1818 earned his medical doctorate. Later on, he became a physician at Hôpital Saint-Antoine (1825), and at the Hôpital de la Charité (1832), and was also a consultant-physician to King Louis-Philippe. In 1862 he attained the chair of comparative anatomy and was named dean of the Faculty of Medicine at Paris.

In 1837 Rayer discovered that the fatal equine disease known as glanders was contagious to other species, including humans.  Between 1837 and 1841 he published a three-volume book on diseases of the kidney titled Traité des maladies des reins. In 1850 Rayer published a paper that provided the first description of the anthrax bacillus (Inoculation du sang de rate, 1850). In this work he documented studies that he performed with physician Casimir Davaine (1812-1882) in regards to Bacillus anthracis. He was elected a Foreign Honorary Member of the American Academy of Arts and Sciences in 1855.

Rayer was a member of the Académie de Médecine and the Académie des Sciences, and co-founder of the Société de biologie, of which he was also president. He maintained friendships with several influential people in France, that included naturalist Isidore Geoffroy Saint-Hilaire, novelist George Sand and philosopher Émile Littré.

Eponyms associated with Pierre Rayer 
 Rayer's disease: A disorder characterized by chronic jaundice, splenomegaly, and hepatomegaly. 
 Rayer's nodules: A xanthoma; yellowish nodules on the skin (often on the eyelids).

See also 
 Timeline of tuberous sclerosis

References

External links 
 Images from Traité théorique et pratique des maladies de la peau From The College of Physicians of Philadelphia Digital Library

1793 births
1867 deaths
People from Calvados (department)
French dermatologists
French pathologists
Academic staff of the University of Paris
Fellows of the American Academy of Arts and Sciences
Members of the French Academy of Sciences
Grand Officiers of the Légion d'honneur